SPSD can refer to:
Southfield Public School District
Saskatoon Public School Division
Symmetric Positive Semi-Definite matrix, in linear algebra